Martin Falkeborn (born 8 January 1993) is a Swedish footballer who plays as a right back for Europa Point in the Gibraltar Football League.

References

External links

Martin Falkeborn at Fotbolltransfers

1993 births
Living people
Swedish footballers
Swedish expatriate footballers
Association football defenders
IF Brommapojkarna players
Akropolis IF players
Egersunds IK players
Lillestrøm SK players
Ullensaker/Kisa IL players
IK Frej players
Syrianska FC players
Allsvenskan players
Superettan players
Eliteserien players
Norwegian First Division players
Swedish expatriate sportspeople in Norway
Expatriate footballers in Norway